are one of the several possible ways of reading Japanese kanji. They are based on the classical pronunciations of Chinese characters of the then-prestigious eastern Jiankang (now Nanjing) dialect.

Go-on preceded the  readings. Both go-on and kan-on exhibit characteristics of Middle Chinese.

History and uses 
Go-on readings were introduced into Japan during the 5th and 6th centuries, when China was divided into separate Northern and Southern dynasties. They may have been imported either directly from the Southern dynasty or from the Korean Peninsula. There was an influx of thinkers from China and Korea to Japan at that time, including practitioners of both Buddhism and Confucianism.  However, there is no historical documentation to demonstrate that go-on readings are actually based on Southern Chinese.

Shibatani has noted that go-on readings make up the first of three waves of Chinese loans to the Japanese language, the others being kan-on and tou-sou-on (meaning Tang Song sound), with go-on being mainly associated with Buddhism.

Go-on readings are particularly common for Buddhist and legal terminology, especially those of the Nara and Heian periods. These readings were also used for the Chinese characters of the ancient Japanese syllabary used in the Kojiki.

When kan-on readings were introduced to Japan, their go-on equivalents did not disappear entirely. Even today, go-on and kan-on readings still both exist. Many characters have both pronunciations. For instance, the name Shōtoku (which is go-on) is pronounced as such in some derived placenames, but as Seitoku (which is kan-on) in others.

However, some go-on sounds are now lost. Even though monolingual Japanese dictionaries list a complete inventory of go-on for all characters, some were actually reconstructed using the fanqie method or were inferred to be the same as their modern homophones.

Names
The term 'go-on' was first introduced in the mid-Heian, likely by people who wished to promote kan-on readings. It is thought that Japanese students studying in China adopted this practice, and, taking the position that the Chang'an-based manner of elocution were the correct ones, they also began to refer to the previously imported, unfashionable kanji readings as "go-on".

Characteristics
Go-on readings are generally less orderly than kan-on readings, but can be characterized as follows.
 voiced consonants in Middle Chinese were distinguished from unvoiced consonants when they occurred in syllable-initial positions.
 Syllable-initial nasal consonants are pronounced as nasals (m-, n-) in Middle Chinese, but in kan-on, they are interpreted as voiced plosives (b-, d-).
 In some characters, -o and -u are both acceptable and widespread, e.g., 素 (so, su), 奴 (do, nu) and 都 (to, tsu).

See also
 Kan-on: a later pronunciation
 Tō-on: an even later pronunciation
 Checked tone

Notes

References
Most of the content of this article comes from the equivalent Japanese-language article, accessed on June 5, 2006.

Kanji